Reproductive endocrinology may refer to:
 Reproductive endocrinology and infertility, about the subspecialty of obstetrics and gynecology for physicians
 Endocrinology of reproduction, about bodily mechanisms of reproductive endocrinology